Margaret (Maggie) Fraser Myles, née Findlay, (December 1892 - February 1988) was a Scottish midwife, midwifery tutor and lecturer and author. She is globally known for her Textbook for Midwives, first published in 1953, which has been considered a reference midwifery textbook for decades.

Early years 
Myles was born on 30 December 1892 in Aberdeen, Scotland, to Robert Fraser Findlay, a house painter, and Mary, née McDougall. After finishing her secondary education, she emigrated to Canada where she trained as a nurse. There, she married Charles James Myles, a farmer and army officer during World War I, who died shortly after the birth of their son, Ian. She proceeded to return to Scotland for further training and practice, and lost her son to pneumonia in 1924.

Career 
After the loss of her son, Myles left her position as a district nurse at Alford, Aberdeenshire and decided to re-train as a nurse at the Royal Infirmary of Edinburgh. Following this time, the hospital where she received her initial training in Yorktown (Yorkton), Canada invited her as a matron. Myles proceeded to continue her education at McGill University, later getting appointed a senior tutor at the Postgraduate Hospital in Philadelphia and the director of midwifery education of the Women's Hospital, Detroit.

In 1935, upon hearing of news of a new maternity hospital in Edinburgh, she returned to the United Kingdom. Having received a midwifery teacher's diploma in London 1939, she became a midwifery tutor to the new Simson Memorial Maternity Pavilion in the Scottish capital, where she practised until her retirement in 1954.

Writing career 
During her career, Myles contributed as an author to various academic journals in Britain, Canada and the United States. She also wrote a book on how to care for babies, intended for school children.

Textbook for Midwives 
Myles most seminal piece of writing has been her Textbook for Midwives, firstly published by Churchill Livingston in 1953. Although the book was published one year before her retirement, having had recognised a gap in midwifery education, Myles had started working on it since her tutor years. The book has been identified as Book of the Year as part of the seventy-fifth anniversary celebrations of the American Journal of Nursing. Myles Textbook for Midwives has been translated in many languages and is currently sold around the world, with its seventeen edition to be published in 2020. Out of these editions, Myles herself worked on ten revisions between 1952 and 1985, updating the content with the latest best practices and developments and removing obsolete knowledge and practice.

Later career and death 
Following her retirement from practice, Myles continued to visit and lecture at midwifery schools and obstetric units around the world, including the United Kingdom, the United States, Canada, Africa, Australia and New Zealand. Although having turned down many awards for honours and honorary appointments in her career, in 1978, she received an Honorary Fellowship of the Edinburgh Obstetrical Society. She died at Banchory, Kincardineshire in 1988, leaving a large legacy of midwifery experience and education behind her.

References 

1892 births
1988 deaths
Midwifery in the United Kingdom
Nurses of the Royal Infirmary of Edinburgh